In meteorology, lee waves are atmospheric stationary waves. The most common form is mountain waves, which are atmospheric internal gravity waves.  These were discovered in 1933 by two German glider pilots, Hans Deutschmann and Wolf Hirth, above the Krkonoše.
They are periodic changes of atmospheric pressure, temperature and orthometric height in a current of air caused by vertical displacement, for example orographic lift when the wind blows over a mountain or mountain range. They can also be caused by the surface wind blowing over an escarpment or plateau, or even by upper winds deflected over a thermal updraft or cloud street.

The vertical motion forces periodic changes in speed and direction of the air within this air current. They always occur in groups on the lee side of the terrain that triggers them. Sometimes, mountain waves can help to enhance precipitation amounts downwind of mountain ranges. Usually a turbulent vortex, with its axis of rotation parallel to the mountain range, is generated around the first trough; this is called a rotor. The strongest lee waves are produced when the lapse rate shows a stable layer above the obstruction, with an unstable layer above and below.

Strong winds (with wind gusts over 100 mph [161 kmh]) can be created in the foothills of large mountain ranges by mountain waves. These strong winds can contribute to unexpected wildfire growth and spread (including the 2016 Great Smoky Mountains wildfires when sparks from a wildfire in the Smoky Mountains were blown into the Gatlinburg and Pigeon Forge areas).

Basic theory 

Lee waves are a form of internal gravity waves produced when a stable, stratified flow is forced over an obstacle. This disturbance elevates air parcels above their level of neutral buoyancy. Buoyancy restoring forces therefore act to excite a vertical oscillation of the perturbed air parcels at the Brunt-Väisäla frequency, which for the atmosphere is:

, where  is the vertical profile of potential temperature.

These air parcel oscillations occur in concert, parallel to the wave fronts (lines of constant phase). These wave fronts represent extrema in the perturbed pressure field (i.e., lines of lowest and highest pressure), while the areas between wave fronts represent extrema in the perturbed buoyancy field (i.e., areas most rapidly gaining or losing buoyancy).

Energy is transmitted along the wave fronts (parallel to air parcel oscillations), which is the direction of the wave group velocity. In contrast, the phase propagation (or phase speed) of the waves points perpendicular to energy transmission (or group velocity).

Clouds

Both lee waves and the rotor may be indicated by specific wave cloud formations if there is sufficient moisture in the atmosphere, and sufficient vertical displacement to cool the air to the dew point. Waves may also form in dry air without cloud markers. Wave clouds do not move downwind as clouds usually do, but remain fixed in position relative to the obstruction that forms them.

 Around the crest of the wave, adiabatic expansion cooling can form a cloud in shape of a lens (lenticularis). Multiple lenticular clouds can be stacked on top of each other if there are alternating layers of relatively dry and moist air aloft.
 The rotor may generate  cumulus or cumulus fractus in its upwelling portion, also known as a "roll cloud". The rotor cloud looks like a line of cumulus. It forms on the lee side and parallel to the ridge line.  Its base is near the height of the mountain peak, though the top can extend well above the peak and can merge with the lenticular clouds above. Rotor clouds have ragged leeward edges and are dangerously turbulent.
 A foehn wall cloud may exist at the lee side of the mountains, however this is not a reliable indication of the presence of lee waves.
 A pileus or cap cloud, similar to a lenticular cloud, may form above the mountain or cumulus cloud generating the wave.
 Adiabatic compression heating in the trough of each wave oscillation may also evaporate cumulus or stratus clouds in the airmass, creating a "wave window" or "Foehn gap".

Aviation

Lee waves provide a possibility for gliders to gain altitude or fly long distances when soaring. World record wave flight performances for speed, distance or altitude have been made in the lee of the Sierra Nevada, Alps, Patagonic Andes, and Southern Alps mountain ranges. The Perlan Project is working to demonstrate the viability of climbing above the tropopause in an unpowered glider using lee waves, making the transition into stratospheric standing waves. The Mountain Wave Project of the Organisation Scientifique et Technique du Vol à Voile focusses on analysis and classification of lee waves and associated rotors.

The conditions favoring strong lee waves suitable for soaring are:

 A gradual increase in windspeed with altitude
 Wind direction within 30° of perpendicular to the mountain ridgeline
 Strong low-altitude winds in a stable atmosphere
 Ridgetop winds of at least 20 knots

The rotor turbulence may be harmful for other small aircraft such as balloons, hang gliders and paragliders. It can even be a hazard for large aircraft; the phenomenon is believed responsible for many aviation accidents and incidents, including the in-flight breakup of BOAC Flight 911, a Boeing 707, near Mount Fuji, Japan in 1966, and the in-flight separation of an engine on an Evergreen International Airlines Boeing 747 cargo jet near Anchorage, Alaska in 1993.

The rising air of the wave, which allows gliders to climb to great heights, can also result in high-altitude upset in jet aircraft trying to maintain level cruising flight in lee waves. Rising, descending or turbulent air, in or above the lee waves, can cause overspeed, stall or loss of control.

Other varieties of atmospheric waves

There are a variety of distinctive types of waves which form under different atmospheric conditions.

 Wind shear can also create waves. This occurs when an atmospheric inversion separates two layers with a marked difference in wind direction. If the wind encounters distortions in the inversion layer caused by thermals coming up from below, it will create significant shear waves in the lee of the distortions that can be used for soaring.

 Hydraulic jump induced waves are a type of wave that forms when there exists a lower layer of air which is dense, yet thin relative to the size of the mountain.  After flowing over the mountain, a type of shock wave forms at the trough of the flow, and a sharp vertical discontinuity called the hydraulic jump forms which can be several times higher than the mountain.  The hydraulic jump is similar to a rotor in that it is very turbulent, yet it is not as spatially localized as a rotor.  The hydraulic jump itself acts as an obstruction for the stable layer of air moving above it, thereby triggering wave.  Hydraulic jumps can distinguished by their towering roll clouds, and have been observed on the Sierra Nevada range as well as mountain ranges in southern California.
 Hydrostatic waves are vertically propagating waves which form over spatially large obstructions.  In hydrostatic equilibrium, the pressure of a fluid can depend only on altitude, not on horizontal displacement.  Hydrostatic waves get their name from the fact that they approximately obey the laws of hydrostatics, i.e. pressure amplitudes vary primarily in the vertical direction instead of the horizontal.  Whereas conventional, non-hydrostatic waves are characterized by horizontal undulations of lift and sink, largely independent of altitude, hydrostatic waves are characterized by undulations of lift and sink at different altitudes over the same ground position.
 Kelvin–Helmholtz instability can occur when velocity shear is present within a continuous fluid or when there is sufficient velocity difference across the interface between two fluids.
 Rossby waves (or planetary waves) are large-scale motions in the atmosphere whose restoring force is the variation in Coriolis effect with latitude.

See also
 Gravity wave
 Nor'west arch

References

Further reading
 Grimshaw, R., (2002). Environmental Stratified Flows. Boston: Kluwer Academic Publishers.
 Jacobson, M., (1999). Fundamentals of Atmospheric Modeling. Cambridge, UK: Cambridge University Press.
 Nappo, C., (2002). An Introduction to Atmospheric Gravity Waves. Boston: Academic Press.
 Pielke, R., (2002). Mesoscale Meteorological Modeling. Boston: Academic Press.
 Turner, B., (1979). Buoyancy Effects in Fluids. Cambridge, UK: Cambridge University Press.
 Whiteman, C., (2000). Mountain Meteorology. Oxford, UK: Oxford University Press.

External links 

 Mountain Wave Project official website
 Chronological collection of meteorological data, satellite pics and cloud images of mountain waves in Bariloche, Argentina (in Spanish)
 On High Winds and Foehn Warming associated with Mountain-Wave Events in the Western Foothills of the Southern Appalachian Mountains
 An Examination of the Areal Extent of High Winds due to Mountain Waves along the Western Foothills of the Southern Appalachian Mountains

Atmospheric dynamics
Cumulus
Gliding technology
Gravity waves
Mesoscale meteorology
Mountain meteorology
Sailing